The New Democratic Party of Manitoba leadership election of 2009 was prompted by party leader Gary Doer's announced pending resignation. Doer announced on August 27, 2009, that he intended to resign as leader of the New Democratic Party of Manitoba and Premier of Manitoba and the next day he announced that he was to become the next Canadian Ambassador to the United States. A leadership convention was held on October 16–17 to choose the new leader. There were two candidates for the position: former Minister of Intergovernmental Affairs, Steve Ashton and former Minister of Finance, Greg Selinger. Selinger received 65.75% of the ballots, and as such was elected party leader and became Premier-designate.

Declared candidates

Steve Ashton
Steve Ashton is the Member of the Legislative Assembly for Thompson and was the Minister of Intergovernmental Affairs until he resigned to run for the leadership on September 4, 2009.

Endorsements
 Niki Ashton, Member of Parliament for Churchill
 Daryl Reid, Member of the Legislative Assembly for Transcona
 Bidhu Jha, Member of the Legislative Assembly

Greg Selinger
Greg Selinger is the Member of the Legislative Assembly for St. Boniface and was the Minister of Finance until he resigned to run for the leadership on September 8, 2009.

Endorsements
Provincial cabinet ministers
 Nancy Allan, Minister of Labour and Immigration
 Diane McGifford, Minister of Advanced Education and Literacy
 Christine Melnick, Minister of Water Stewardship
 Kerri Irvin-Ross, Minister of Healthy Living
 Theresa Oswald, Minister of Health
 Eric Robinson, Minister of Culture, Heritage, Tourism and Sport and Acting Minister of Aboriginal and Northern Affairs
 Jim Rondeau, Minister of Energy, Science and Technology
 Rosann Wowchuk, Minister of Agriculture, Food and Rural Initiatives

Members of Parliament
 Judy Wasylycia-Leis, Member of Parliament for Winnipeg North

Members of the Legislative Assembly
 Rob Altemeyer, Member of the Legislative Assembly for Wolseley
 Bill Blaikie, Member of the Legislative Assembly for Elmwood and former Dean of the House of Commons and Member of Parliament for Elmwood—Transcona
 Marilyn Brick, Member of the Legislative Assembly for St. Norbert
 Drew Caldwell, Member of the Legislative Assembly for Brandon East
 Greg Dewar, Member of the Legislative Assembly for Selkirk
 Jennifer Howard, Member of the Legislative Assembly for Fort Rouge
 Bonnie Korzeniowski, Member of the Legislative Assembly for St. James
 Flor Marcelino, Member of the Legislative Assembly for Wellington
 Doug Martindale, Member of the Legislative Assembly for Burrows
 Mohinder Saran, Member of the Legislative Assembly for The Maples

Other high-profile endorsements
 Darlene Dziewit, former President of the Manitoba Federation of Labour
 Jenny Gerbasi, Winnipeg City Councillor for Fort Rouge—East Fort Garry
 Paul Moist, National President of the Canadian Union of Public Employees
 Muriel Smith, former Deputy Premier

Withdrawn candidates

Andrew Swan
Andrew Swan is the Member of the Legislative Assembly for Minto and was the Minister of Competitiveness, Training and Trade until he resigned to run for the leadership on September 2, 2009. Swan dropped out of the race on September 28, 2009 and regained his ministerial positions on October 5, 2009.

Did not run
Nancy Allan, Minister of Labour and Immigration
Bill Blaikie, MLA and former Dean of the Canadian House of Commons
Dave Chomiak, Minister of Justice
Jennifer Howard, MLA
Bidhu Jha, MLA
Gord Mackintosh, Minister of Family Services and Housing
Pat Martin, MP (Winnipeg Centre)
Christine Melnick, Minister of Water Stewardship
Theresa Oswald, Minister of Health
Stan Struthers, Conservation Minister
Dan Vandal, Winnipeg city councillor
Judy Wasylycia-Leis, MP and former provincial cabinet minister

Results

Resources

2009
2009 elections in Canada
2009 in Manitoba
New Democratic Party of Manitoba leadership election